Park Hoon-jung is a South Korean film director and screenwriter. Park first attracted notice within the Korean film industry for writing the screenplays for Kim Jee-woon's I Saw the Devil (2010) and Ryoo Seung-wan's The Unjust (2010). He made his debut as a director in 2011 with the period film The Showdown. With his second film, gangster epic New World (2013), Park scored a critical and commercial success.

Early career
Park was born in 1975. Since late 1980s, in his teen, he was already a Cinephilia. In 1991, when he was in his second year of high school, he set a future goal to be a film director. However, He enrolled to natural science department in college. After repeating his first college year twice, he enlisted to mandatory military service. He then applied for a noncommissioned officer and was discharged as a sergeant five years later. After five years of military leave, he naturally dropped out of college.

At the time of his discharge, he participated in a game scenario contest held by the Venture Association, which was when he was elected and joined a game company as a special recruit, working with game scenario. However, the company changed its business course to something else. Park then started another game company with the people he worked with, but the business didn’t go well. In the meantime, he won synopsis contest hosted by Sidus HQ, which was opened doors for Park to the film industry.

Career

Debut as scriptwriter

Park made his breakthrough as a screenwriter for writing the screenplays for Kim Jee-woon's film I Saw the Devil (2010) and Ryoo Seung-wan's film The Unjust (2010). The two films released in 2010, imprinted the name of 'Park Hoon-jung' in Chungmuro.

After I Saw the Devil premiered in South Korea on August 12, 2010, it was screened at the 2011 Sundance Film Festival on 21 January 2011. It also were screened at several other international film festivals, including the Fantasporto Film Festival, Toronto International Film Festival, Sitges Film Festival, San Sebastian Film Festival and the London Korean Film Festival. The film received mostly favorable review from international movie critics.

The Unjust has screened at numerous film festivals around the world, including the Panorama section of the 61st Berlin International Film Festival, the Hong Kong International Film Festival, the Shanghai International Film Festival, the New York Asian Film Festival, the Fantasia Festival, the Hawaii International Film Festival, the Vladivostok International Film Festival - Pacific Meridian, the Sitges Film Festival, the London Korean Film Festival, and the Udine Far East Film Festival. Park won many awards from his screenplay for The Unjust (2010).

Career as director

Park made his directorial debut with film The Showdown which was released in 2011. He wrote the script in 2006 and offered the script to other directors and production companies. However they all wanted to tell a different story while keeping only the basic framework. Park felt like it was too far from his vision, so he thought of directing the film himself. The film failed to reach commercial success.

Park planned his next work, Korean-style noir film 'Shinsegae' or New World. Due to his first film commercial failure, He met challenges. Park said, "The side that wants to invest asked for two things. 'The scenario and actors are good, but change the director and genre', or 'Noir is not a box office hit, so let's cut the production cost.'" However after its released, it managed to accumulate audience of 4.68 million (based on the results of the integrated computer network of the Korea Film Commission). New World became Park first box office success. He was praised for pioneering a new path for Korean-style noir.

Park reunited with Choi Min-sik in historical film works The Tiger: An Old Hunter's Tale. Set in 1925, during the Japanese colonial period, it depicts the fateful story of Cheon Man-deok, a tiger hunter, and the last tiger of Joseon. Although it is a commercial blockbuster film that cost 14 billion won, according to Park, He and his team had hard time to create a realistic tiger with only about 1/11 of the production cost of Life of Pi that also use CGI Animation for its tiger character. Even though it’s rather disappointing in terms of box office success, it has been praised for its high-quality production through CG work, successfully vividly embodied Joseon tiger. Park nominated and won a couple awards for his directing and script and his team won technical awards for their CGI Animation.

His subsequent work V.I.P. were disappointing in terms of box office success. In particular, V.I.P., which was released in 2017, was heavily criticized for portraying excessive violence against women.

In 2016 he founded a film production company, 'Geumwol'. The name of the production company is derived from the Chinese characters for the criminal organization 'Goldmoon' in the movie New World. Park said, “There are many well-known works, but not many successful works,” said that he set up the company “to do the work he wanted to make” and “to not feel sorry for the production company when it didn’t do well.”

In 2018, Park wrote and direct is a 2018 South Korean science fictionaction horror film The Witch: Part 1. The Subversion.  A sequel, The Witch: Part 2. The Other One, was released on 15 June 2022.

Park wrote and directed Night in Paradise (2020 film), starring Uhm Tae-goo, Jeon Yeo-been and Cha Seung-won. It had its world premiere on September 3, 2020, at the 77th Venice International Film Festival and was released on April 9, 2021 on Netflix.

Filmography

Recurring Cast 
Park frequently re-casts actors whom he has worked with on previous films.

Awards and nominations

References

External links

Living people
1975 births
South Korean film directors
Male screenwriters
South Korean screenwriters